Metal Discharge is the eighth full-length album by German thrash metal band Destruction, released on September 22, 2003.

It was the first Destruction album to feature drummer Marc "Speedy" Reign of Morgoth.

Track listing

Personnel 
Writing, performance and production credits are adapted from the album liner notes.

Destruction
 Schmier – bass, lead vocals
 Mike Sifringer – guitars
 Marc Reign – drums, backing vocals

Additional musicians
 V.O. Pulver – guitar solo on "The Ravenous Beast", backing vocals
 Andre Grieder – backing vocals
 Inga Pulver – backing vocals
 Franky Winkelmann – backing vocals
 "Tschibu" – backing vocals

Production
 V.O. Pulver – production, engineering, mixing, mastering
 Destruction – production
 Frank Winkelmann – engineering, mixing

References

External links 
 
  Metal Discharge at Nuclear Blast

2003 albums
Destruction (band) albums
Nuclear Blast albums